Ansaloni is a surname. Notable people with the surname include:

Giordano Ansaloni (1598–1634), Italian explorer and trader
Vincenzo Ansaloni (died 1615), Italian painter

See also
Ulmus pumila 'Ansaloni', Siberian Elm cultivar
Ponsard-Ansaloni, power conversion device

Italian-language surnames